National File is an American right-wing blog and news website founded in August 2019. It is known for publishing false or misleading claims about COVID-19.

Company 
National File was founded in August 2019. Its editor-in-chief and owner is Tom Pappert. Patrick Howley is a politics reporter for the website.

Content 
National File has been described as right-wing, far-right, and conservative. It is known for publishing COVID-19 misinformation, including false claims that the Centers for Disease Control and Prevention exaggerated the number of COVID-19 fatalities, that Pfizer was developing an oral drug to be administered "alongside vaccines", and that the Pfizer–BioNTech COVID-19 vaccine caused neurodegenerative conditions. National File also publishes misinformation about the 2020 United States presidential election. As of early 2021, National File is the 10th most followed account on Gab, a social networking service known for its far-right userbase.

On January 14, 2020, National File reiterated a story from trade publication Tri-State Livestock News, wherein South Dakota cattle veterinarian James Stangle falsely claims that Impossible Whoppers contain "44 mg of estrogen" and that "six glasses of soy milk per day has enough estrogen to grow boobs on a male." Stangle later retracted this story as, in fact, he was referring to isoflavones, not estrogen; Impossible Whoppers contain 2 mg of isoflavones, not 44; and –  – there is no evidence showing a link between isoflavones and feminization or childhood development, and there is evidence to the contrary.  

On October 7, 2020, Patrick Howley of National File broke the story that Cal Cunningham, then a democratic candidate in the 2020 Senate election in North Carolina, had exchanged sexually suggestive texts with a woman who was not his wife.

On October 23, 2020, National File published photos they claimed showed Mark Kelly, at the time a candidate in the 2020 special election in Arizona, at a college party in 1985 dressed as Adolf Hitler. Several classmates of Kelly's stated that he was not the man in the photo, and PolitiFact rated the National File story "false". Kelly filed a defamation lawsuit against National File on October 26.

On February 27, 2022, two days before the Texas Republican primary runoff election, National File posted audio of an interview with former jihadist Tania Joya, a British woman then living in Plano, Texas, who claimed that she and Van Taylor—U.S. representative for Plano and primary candidate—had a nine-month sexual affair in 2020 and 2021. Joya shared salacious details about the alleged affair and said that Taylor had given her  for personal expenses. Her allegations were widely circulated on social media, prompting Taylor to admit to an extramarital affair and end his reelection campaign, effectively ceding the election to opponent Keith Self. Taylor was one of the few Republican U.S. representatives to join Democrats in voting to establish the January 6 commission to investigate the storming of the U.S. Capitol, a vote that caused him to be intensely criticized by primary election opponents and conservative commentators, despite his conservative voting record on other issues.

References

External links 
 

2019 establishments in the United States
American news websites
American political blogs
COVID-19 misinformation
Conspiracist media
Internet properties established in 2019
Right-wing populism in the United States